Stefania Gabriella Anastasia Craxi (born 25 October 1960 in Milan) is an Italian politician, daughter of the former 
Italian Prime Minister Bettino Craxi and sister of Bobo Craxi.

Biography
Stefania Craxi was an entrepreneur in the world of television, she left her career as a television producer in 2000.

She entered politics in 2006, when she was elected MP with Forza Italia. She was re-elected MP in 2008, among the ranks of The People of Freedom. She also served as Undersecretary at the Ministry of Foreign Affairs in the Berlusconi IV Cabinet, from 2008 to 2011. In 2011 she left the PdL and founded the Italian Reformists.

In the general election of 2018 she was candidate for the Senate in the uninominal constituency of Monza-Seregno (supported by the centre-right coalition) and she was elected with the 46.79% of the vote.

Personal life
She married twice: to entrepreneur Renato Neri, with whom she had her son Federico (1987); and to Marco Bassetti, former president of the television distribution company Endemol, now in charge of Banijay, with whom she had daughters Benedetta and Anita (1991).

References

External links 
 ‘Secretary of State Stefania Gabriella Anastasia Craxi’, Italian Ministry of Foreign affairs.
 The website of the new political party founded by Stefania Craxi

1960 births
Living people
Politicians from Milan
The People of Freedom politicians
21st-century Italian politicians
Forza Italia politicians
Forza Italia (2013) politicians
Italian Socialist Party politicians
Women government ministers of Italy
Senators of Legislature XVIII of Italy
21st-century Italian women politicians
Forza Italia (2013) senators
Deputies of Legislature XV of Italy
Deputies of Legislature XVI of Italy
20th-century Italian women
Women members of the Chamber of Deputies (Italy)
Women members of the Senate of the Republic (Italy)